Covering cherub (in literary usage) is the obstructing presence for the artist of the inherited tradition, and cultural predecessors, with which they are faced.

Origins
Found originally in Ezekiel, the covering cherub was adapted for use by (among others) both Milton and William Blake.  In the Blakean vision, the covering cherub was a composite but always negative figure of truth's guardian turned destructive, of a cruel and hardened Selfhood; and it was from Blake that in 1967 Harold Bloom derived his concept of the covering cherub as a literary/cultural barrier.  Apparently, a waking nightmare he experienced gave rise first to his poem on the subject, "The Covering Cherub", and eventually to his book The Anxiety of Influence.

Thematics
For Bloom, "the Covering Cherub then is a demon of continuity...cultural history, the dead poets, the embarrassments  of a tradition grown too wealthy to need anything more".  Bloom considered the artistic struggle in Freudian terms, as a filial contest with a father figure carrying cultural authority – an Oedipal conflict with a superego either originally modelled on a cultural hero or influenced subsequently by such an ideal model.

Though initially referencing a patriarchal father/son interaction, the concept of the covering cherub has also been applied to works by women writers such as Angela Carter and Virginia Woolf.

Criticism
Some critics have seen Bloom's central image as too open-ended to serve as analytical tool, a vague series of analogies only tenuously working as Bloom desired.

See also

References

External links 
 Angelus novus

Literary criticism
Interpretation (philosophy)